Alex Preston Philbrick (born May 6, 1993), better known as Alex Preston, is an American singer from Mont Vernon, New Hampshire, who was a finalist on the thirteenth season of American Idol, coming in third place. On July 21, 2015, he released his self-titled debut album. His second album, A Work in Progress, was released in 2018.

Early life
Alex Preston was born and raised in Mont Vernon, New Hampshire. He wrote his first song called "Fish Food" when he was 12.  He attended Souhegan High School in Amherst, New Hampshire where he played the guitar in a jazz band, and in the percussion section in concert and a marching band. He also formed a band with friends, Dustin Newhouse, Josh Brackett and Tucker Brown, called Undertow. He graduated from high school in 2011, and studied at the University of New Hampshire.

Preston has written songs with his cousin Jo Dee Messina, the rock band Framing Hanley, and Aria Summer.  His song was used in the CD "Voices for Heroes," a benefit for Sandy Hook. He won the "Open For MixFest" competition organized by a radio station to open for acts such as Backstreet Boys, Gavin DeGraw and Of Monsters and Men. His single "The Light Was Already Here" was released in September 2013.

American Idol

2014–2019: Alex Preston album and A Work in Progress
His debut, self-titled album was recorded in a cabin in Lone Pine, California and was released in 2015. His second album, A Work in Progress, was released in 2018. In 2019, he won a New England Emmy Award in the Special Event Coverage category for the program NH Chronicle Presents New Hampshire Idol.

Discography

Albums
 Alex Preston (2015)
 "Break My Heart"
 "You"
 "Fairytales"
 "The Light Was Already Here"
 "Close to You"
 "200 Miles"
 "The Author"
 "Get Up, Get Down"
 "Love Letters"
 A Work in Progress (2018)

Digital singles

References

American Idol participants
Living people
21st-century American singers
People from Mont Vernon, New Hampshire
Singers from New Hampshire
1993 births
21st-century American male singers

id:Alex Preston